Kozji Vrh is a settlement in the hills above the left bank of the Drava River in the Municipality of Podvelka in Slovenia.

References

External links
Kozji Vrh on Geopedia

Populated places in the Municipality of Podvelka